Walid Ould-Chikh (born 6 November 1999) is a Dutch professional footballer who plays for Volendam, as a forward.

Personal life
His older brother Bilal is also a footballer.

References

1999 births
Sportspeople from Roosendaal
Living people
Dutch footballers
FC Volendam players
Tweede Divisie players
Eerste Divisie players
Association football forwards
Footballers from North Brabant
Dutch sportspeople of Moroccan descent
DHSC players
USV Hercules players
Eredivisie players